Kaabong General Hospital, also Kaabong District Hospital, is a public hospital in the Northeastern Region of Uganda.

Location

The coordinates of Kaabong General Hospital are 03°30'39.0"N, 34°07'53.0"E (Latitude:03.510833; Longitude:34.131389).

Overview
Kaabong General Hospital was established in 2011, by the elevation of Kaabong Health Centre IV to full hospital status. Kaabong General Hospital is on the list of general hospitals earmarked for renovation and expansion.

See also
List of hospitals in Uganda

References

External links
 Website of Uganda Ministry of Health
 Uganda: Suffering From Chronic Neglect in Kaabong - 19 May 2011

Hospitals established in 2011
2011 establishments in Uganda
Kaabong
Kaabong District
Karamoja
Northern Region, Uganda